SS Vaderland may refer to one of the following ships of the Red Star Line named after the Dutch word for fatherland:

 , sailed for Red Star Line from Antwerp to Philadelphia; sold to French concern and renamed Géographique; sunk in collision October 1889
 , built by John Brown & Co., Glasgow, Scotland; in transatlantic service for Red Star Line and the American Line through 1914, White Star-Dominion from 1914; renamed Southland and used as troopship; torpedoed in Aegean Sea in 1915 and repaired; torpedoes and sunk in Irish Sea by U-70 on 4 June 1916

See also 
 , named after the German word for fatherland: SS Vaterland built in 1913, was an ocean liner which regularly crossed the North Atlantic from 1914 to 1934. The second of three sister ships built for Germany's Hamburg America Line for their transatlantic passenger service, she sailed as Vaterland for less than a year before her early career was halted by the start of World War I. In 1917, she was seized by the U.S. government and renamed Leviathan. She would become known by this name for the majority of her career, both as a troopship during World War I and later as the flagship of the United States Lines.

Ship names